Belnemus is a historic home located near Powhatan, Powhatan County, Virginia. The original section was built about 1798, and enlarged in the 1820s and in the 20th century.  The original section has a "Palladian" plan with a central two-story, three bay central section with a hipped roof and flanking one-story wings.  It features a full-length, one-story porch, with four Tuscan order columns and lattice balustrade.  Also on the property are a number of contributing outbuildings including a smokehouse, dairy, and equipment shed.

It was added to the National Register of Historic Places in 1979.

References

External links
Belnemus, U.S. Route 60 vicinity, Powhatan, Powhatan County, VA: 3 photos and 4 data pages at Historic American Buildings Survey

Houses on the National Register of Historic Places in Virginia
Georgian architecture in Virginia
Houses completed in 1798
Houses in Powhatan County, Virginia
National Register of Historic Places in Powhatan County, Virginia
Historic American Buildings Survey in Virginia